Sex Over the Phone is the ninth studio album by Village People. The title track, "Sex Over the Phone", had some airplay in Europe, but did not reach the height of the group's earlier releases. As gay subtexts are often found in Village People songs, some have suggested that themes in this album refer to safer sex due to the emergence of AIDS within the gay community during the 1980s. The album is also notable for the appearance of new lead singer, Ray Stephens, who also played Roy on the children's television show The Great Space Coaster during the same period.

The cover photo for the album sees the group donning updated versions of their iconic costumes, after having mostly dropped the imagery (on album covers, at least) several years earlier (see Renaissance).

The 1999 CD release includes the 1999 club mix of the title track. In 2009, the album was released in digital format through online music retailers.

Track listing
"Sex Over the Phone" – 4:22
"New York City" – 6:00
"Just Give Me What I Want" – 6:12
"I Won't Take No for an Answer" – 4:28
"Power of the Night" – 5:58
"Sexual Education" – 5:32
"Sensual" – 4:37
"Sex Over the Phone" (New Recorded Club Mix) – 4:15 (bonus track on 1999 CD re-release)

Charts

References

1985 albums
Village People albums
CBS Records albums